is a former Japanese Nippon Professional Baseball first baseman and outfielder. He played for the Osaka/Hanshin Tigers from 1956 to 1967.

External links
Career statistics and player information from Baseball-Reference

1937 births
Living people
Hanshin Tigers players
Japanese baseball players
Nippon Professional Baseball first basemen
Nippon Professional Baseball outfielders
Osaka Tigers players